Charles Church (born 17 December 1970) is a British painter best known for his portraits of racehorses.

Biography 

His commissions include many of horse racing's Grade 1 winners including Arc de Triomphe winners Hurricane Run, Dylan Thomas and Zarkava, World Champion Goldikova, US Champion Mineshaft, Australian Champion Sire Fastnet Rock, 2011 Melbourne Cup Winner Dunaden Grand National Winner Mr Frisk, Cheltenham Gold Cup Winners Synchronised and Master Oats, and Epsom Derby winners Pour Moi and Authorized.

Born in Northumberland, Church trained at Newcastle College and the Charles H. Cecil Studios in Florence where he learned to paint using the sight-size portrait tradition.

Because most of his work is painted to commission, it is rarely seen on public display. His one-man exhibitions at galleries in Mayfair in 2005 and 2013 were both sell outs.

Writing in the catalogue of his 2013 show "Further Afield", Sotheby's chairman Henry Wyndham says: "In my opinion, Church's work carries many of the hallmarks of some of the most renowned British painters of the early 20th century."

Church lives and works in Dorset.

References

External links 
 

British painters
British male painters
Equine artists
1970 births
Living people